The William H. Cook Water Tank House is a water tank house located southeast of Jerome, Idaho, United States. The building was constructed circa 1915 and was used to store water for William H. Cook's farm. The rectangular building was constructed with lava rock and contains a metal tank. Although the stone craftsmanship in the building is similar to the work of local stonemason H. T. Pugh, the builder of the house has not been determined.

The building was listed on the National Register of Historic Places on September 8, 1983.

See also

 List of National Historic Landmarks in Idaho
 National Register of Historic Places listings in Jerome County, Idaho

References

1915 establishments in Idaho
Agricultural buildings and structures on the National Register of Historic Places in Idaho
Buildings and structures completed in 1915
Buildings and structures in Jerome County, Idaho
National Register of Historic Places in Jerome County, Idaho
Water tanks on the National Register of Historic Places